Steve Hewlett is a ventriloquist from Basingstoke, Hampshire, England. He was a finalist on the seventh series of Britain's Got Talent.

Early career
Hewlett has previously headlined Cromer Pier.

Britain's Got Talent
He auditioned with a puppet called 'Arthur Lager', depicted as an old man with grey hair. Hewlett's audition was aired in a montage on 18 May 2013. He made it through, and subsequently through to the semi-finals. He appeared again in the semi-final on 1 June with Arthur Lager, and a puppet designed to resemble Simon Cowell, one of the judges. The routine involved Arthur flirting with Amanda Holden. He finished in the top three, and with eventual winners Attraction already through to the final, it was down to the judges to choose the second place in the final between Hewlett and Jordan O'Keefe. It was a split decision, so it was referred back to the public vote, revealing that with 15.1% of the vote, O'Keefe was through to the final, compared to Hewlett's 12%. This left six singing acts in the final, which generated complaints; Holden defended this, and the number of singers on the show, saying "We left it to the public, they wanted Jordan so that was the right decision. You can't argue with the public's decision."

However, earlier in the week, it was revealed that the judges were going to choose a wildcard act out of the third-placed finishers to compete in the final. Hewlett was seen as the popular choice. It was revealed on the night that Hewlett was indeed the wildcard. He performed again in the final with Arthur Lager (now wearing a Onesie) and the puppet of Simon Cowell (wearing a swimsuit and life jacket), as well as a puppet of Sinitta, along with a musical number in the shape of "We Go Together" from Grease at the end, involving the Simon and Sinitta puppets. Despite rave reviews from the judges, Hewlett finished fourth, just narrowly missing out on the top three with 14.7% of the vote, compared to Richard & Adam's 15.4%.

Later career
It was revealed the day after the final that Hewlett had been signed to entertainment agency ROAR Global. In 2014, Hewlett led a team of challengers on the TV quiz show Eggheads. He took puppet Arthur Lager with him. Going Solo In 2016 Steve appeared as a guest on BBC’s Strictly Come Dancing reading Terms & Conditions with his new sidekick Rod Vegas. 

Also in 2016 Hewlett supported Kenny G on his UK tour in Manchester, Birmingham ending at London’s Royal Albert Hall which was followed by touring America & England in the Andy Williams Christmas Extravaganza with The Osmonds.

He also supported Jimmy Osmond on his Moon River & Me Tour in a weeks residence at Falls Casino, Niagara Falls, Canada in 2017.

His first UK Tour ‘Thinking Inside The Box’ was filmed in The Haymarket Basingstoke and 2nd ‘30 Years of talking To Myself‘ was filmed at Blackpool’s Pleasure Beach in 2018.

November 5th to December 23rd 2019 Steve proudly returned & hosted The Thursford Spectacular in Norfolk for the 4th time. His characters included Arthur Lager, Vinnie the Vulture & a member of the audience twice a day for 7 weeks.

In 2020 Steve decided to take 6 months off to complete his upcoming book ‘Ventriloquest’ due out in 2021 which is a Fascinating insight Into the World of Ventriloquists. 2020 Also saw Steve collaborate with his wife Nina & Arthur Lager on two “Social Distancing” songs now on itunes called ‘Two Metre Peter’ followed by ‘One Metre Rita’.

July 2020 Steve started a new Podcast project ‘Eyes & Teeth’ where Steve talks to his favourite Comedy Icons. Out September...

Personal life
He lives with his wife Nina and their daughters Lola-May, who was born on 4 October 2011. Later welcoming Larissa Rose 27 May 2016.

References

Ventriloquists
Living people
Britain's Got Talent contestants
Year of birth missing (living people)